Calvin I. Fletcher House is a historic home located at Indianapolis, Indiana.  It was built in 1895, and is a -story, Queen Anne style brick dwelling on a limestone foundation. It has an elaborate hipped roof with gabled dormers.  It features an eight-sided corner tower with pointed arched windows on each side.  Also on the property is a contributing carriage house.

It was listed on the National Register of Historic Places in 1984.

References

Houses on the National Register of Historic Places in Indiana
Queen Anne architecture in Indiana
Houses completed in 1895
Houses in Indianapolis
National Register of Historic Places in Indianapolis
1895 establishments in Indiana